Neomedaura is currently a monotypic genus of Asian stick insects in the tribe Medaurini, erected by G.W.C. Ho in 2020.  To date, one species has been recorded from Vietnam.

Species
The Phasmida Species File currently only includes the Neomedaura yokdonensis Ho, 2020: named after Yok Don National Park in Đắk Lắk Province, where the type specimens were collected.

References

External links

Phasmatodea genera
Phasmatodea of Asia
Phasmatidae
Monotypic insect genera